Kristýna Plíšková and Evgeniya Rodina won the title, defeating defending champions Taylor Townsend and Yanina Wickmayer, in the final, 7–6(9–7), 6–4.

Seeds

Draw

Draw

References

External Links
Main Draw

Oracle Challenger Series - Doubles
2019 Women's Doubles